The Zydeco Cajun Prairie Byway is a Louisiana Scenic Byway that follows several different state highways, primarily:
LA 10 from south of Washington to Melville;
LA 13 from Crowley to Turkey Creek;
LA 35 and LA 178 from Rayne to Sunset;
LA 103 and LA 740 from Arnaudville to Port Barre;
LA 105 from Krotz Springs to Melville;
LA 182 and US 167 from Sunset to west of Cheneyville;
US 190 from Basile to Krotz Springs; and
LA 3042 from Ville Platte through Chicot State Park.

References

Louisiana Scenic Byways
Tourist attractions in Acadia Parish, Louisiana
Tourist attractions in Avoyelles Parish, Louisiana
Tourist attractions in Evangeline Parish, Louisiana
Tourist attractions in St. Landry Parish, Louisiana
Scenic highways in Louisiana